The 2017–18 Washington Huskies men's basketball team represented the University of Washington in the 2017–18 NCAA Division I men's basketball season. Led by first-year head coach Mike Hopkins, the Huskies played their home games at Alaska Airlines Arena at Hec Edmundson Pavilion in Seattle, Washington as members of the Pac-12 Conference. They finished the season 21–13, 10–8 in Pac-12 play, in a tie for sixth.

Washington lost to tenth-seeded Oregon State in overtime in the first round of the Pac-12 tournament, then received an invitation to the National Invitation Tournament. They defeated Boise State in the first round in Seattle, but lost on the road to Saint Mary's in the second round.

Previous season
The 2016–17 Huskies finished the season at 9–22, 2–16 in Pac-12 play, in eleventh place. Washington lost to sixth-seed USC in the first round of the Pac-12 tournament. On March 15, it was announced that head coach Lorenzo Romar was not retained for a sixteenth year. Four days later, he was succeeded by Hopkins, a longtime assistant at Syracuse under

Off-season

Departures

2017 recruiting class

Future recruits

Roster

Notes 
Devenir Duruisseau departed the team on November 22, 2017, having only played in the Belmont game.

Schedule and results

|-
!colspan=12 style=| Exhibition

|-
!colspan=12 style=| Non-conference regular season

|-
!colspan=12 style=| Pac-12 regular season

|-
!colspan=12 style=| Pac-12 Tournament

|-
!colspan=12 style=| National Invitation Tournament (NIT)

Awards and honors
On March 5, 2018 Mike Hopkins was named Pac-12 Coach of the Year and Matisse Thybulle was named Pac-12 Defensive Player of the Year.

References

Washington Huskies men's basketball seasons
Washington
Washington Huskies basketball, men
Washington Huskies basketball, men
Washington Huskies basketball, men
Washington Huskies basketball, men
Washington